The IX Waffen Mountain Corps of the SS (Croatian), later simply IX SS Mountain Corps, was a Waffen-SS corps during World War II. Originally set up to control Croatian and Albanian SS divisions, it also commanded a variety of other German and Hungarian units of the Waffen-SS. It saw action on the Eastern Front between July 1944 and January 1945 when it was virtually destroyed during the Siege of Budapest.

History
The corps was raised on 21 June 1944 in Bácsalmás, Hungary as a command formation for the 13th Waffen Mountain Division of the SS Handschar (1st Croatian) and the 23rd Waffen Mountain Division of the SS Kama (2nd Croatian) under the command of SS-Gruppenführer Karl-Gustav Sauberzweig. The 13th SS Division was not initially transferred to the corps, being involved in fighting against Yugoslav partisans in the Independent State of Croatia. In August, due to high rates of desertion from the 13th SS Division, Sauberzweig proposed to disarm the Bosnians in both the 13th and 23rd SS Divisions, but Heinrich Himmler instead opted to transport the 2,000 Bosnians of the 23rd SS Division from Hungary to Bosnia and reorganise the remaining troops of both divisions there, with key support units from the 13th SS Division centralised under the IX SS Mountain Corps, which would also move to Bosnia from Hungary.

By September 1944, the Red Army had advanced to the border of Hungary, which placed the corps training area close to the front lines. Kama was not ready for combat and was disbanded; its volunteers went to strengthen the Handschar and the 31st SS Volunteer Grenadier Division. In mid-September, the corps was strengthened by several combat divisions, including the Handschar and went into action against Yugoslav partisans.

In October, the corps was moved to the frontline in Hungary, where it took command of four combat divisions, the 13th Panzer Division, the 60th Panzergrenadier Division Feldherrnhalle, the 8th SS Cavalry Division Florian Geyer, and the 22nd SS Volunteer Cavalry Division Maria Theresa. All these divisions had been involved in the recent heavy fighting around Debrecen. Between them, the divisions barely had 60 tanks.

As all subordinate units were now Germanic, the corps was redesignated as the IX SS Mountain Corps. The renamed corps was ordered to form a part of the 6th Army, defending the approaches to Budapest.

On 24 November 1944, the corps staff arrived in Budapest, the combat divisions already in action against the advancing Soviet forces. After a month's heavy fighting, the corps was encircled in the city. The corps was placed in command of all encircled German units, and Karl Pfeffer-Wildenbruch was placed in command. Having spent his career as a police commander, Pfeffer-Wildenbruch lacked even a basic military understanding, and as the 6th Army commander Hermann Balck said "At best, one could say that Budapest was being led by a politician". Pfeffer-Wildenbruch established his corps command centre on Castle Hill, in the centre of the Hungarian Government District, and ordered the encircled forces to attempt breakouts, which they were unable to accomplish. A rescue effort was being assembled by Balck's army group.

On 1 January 1945, the IV SS Panzer Corps launched Operation Konrad I, the first in a series of relief attempts. After initial gains, the assault stalled. Konrad II followed, which reached to within sight of the city before being halted by stubborn Soviet defences.

By 17 January, the remainder of the corps along with the Hungarian I Corps, commanded by General Iván Hindy, were evacuated across the Danube to Buda. The final relief effort, Konrad III, was halted on 28 January. By this stage, the Axis forces in Buda had been pushed into a one square kilometer pocket. On 11 February, the corps was ordered to attempt a breakout. Only 785 troops were able to reach the German lines, including 170 Waffen-SS men. On 12 February, the remainder of the corps was destroyed, with small groups of men, including Pfeffer-Wildenbruch and his staff, surrendering to the Soviet forces.

Commanders
 SS-Gruppenführer Karl-Gustav Sauberzweig (1 June 1944 – mid-November 1944)
 SS-Obergruppenführer Karl Pfeffer-Wildenbruch (mid-November 1944 – 11 February 1945)

Orders of battle
16 September 1944 – Croatia
Corps staff
 109th SS Corps Signals Battalion
 509th SS Mountain Artillery Regiment
 509th SS Observation Battery
 509th SS Flak Battalion
 509th SS Military Police Troop
 SS Kampfgruppe Dörner
  118th Jäger Division
  7th SS Mountain Division Prinz Eugen
  369th (Croatian) Infantry Division
  13th Waffen Mountain Division of the SS Handschar (1st Croatian)

26 December 1944 – Budapest
Corps staff
 509th SS Mountain Artillery Regiment
 509 SS Heavy Observation Battalion
 509th SS Flak Battalion
 509th SS Military Police Troop
  8th SS Cavalry Division Florian Geyer
  22nd SS Volunteer Cavalry Division Maria Theresa
  13th Panzer Division
  60th Panzergrenadier Division Feldherrnhalle
 271st Infantry Division
 12th Flaksturm Regiment
 4th SS Police Regiment
 4 x ad hoc infantry battalions (comprising surviving elements from other units)

Footnotes

References
 
 

Waffen-SS corps
Military units and formations established in 1944
Mountain corps of Germany in World War II
Military units and formations of Germany in Yugoslavia in World War II
Military units and formations disestablished in 1945